Ypthimomorpha is a monotypic butterfly genus from the subfamily Satyrinae in the family Nymphalidae. It contains only one species, Ypthimomorpha itonia, the marsh ringlet or swamp ringlet, which is found in Senegal, the Gambia, Guinea-Bissau, Guinea, Sierra Leone, Liberia, Ivory Coast, Burkina Faso, Ghana, Togo, Benin, Nigeria, Sudan, Ethiopia, Kenya, Tanzania, Zambia, northern and eastern Zimbabwe, western Mozambique and Botswana. The habitat consists of open, moist areas and marshes on forest margins.

Adults are on wing year round.

The larvae feed on Poaceae species.

References

Satyrini
Monotypic butterfly genera